Constrictolumina is a genus of lichen-forming fungi in the family Trypetheliaceae. The genus was circumscribed in 2016 by Robert Lücking, Matthew Nelsen, and André Aptroot, with Constrictolumina cinchonae assigned as the type species. The genus contains tropical species, formerly placed in genus Arthopyrenia, with a unique hamathecium.

Species
Constrictolumina cinchonae 
Constrictolumina esenbeckiana 
Constrictolumina leucostoma 
Constrictolumina planorbis 
Constrictolumina porospora 

Some species placed in Constrictolumina have since been transferred to the genus Macroconstrictolumina, newly circumscribed in 2020.

References

Trypetheliaceae
Dothideomycetes genera
Lichen genera
Taxa described in 2016
Taxa named by André Aptroot
Taxa named by Robert Lücking